In polynomial algebra and field theory, Joubert's theorem states that if  and  are fields,  is a separable field extension of  of degree 6, and the characteristic of  is not equal to 2, then  is generated over  by some element λ in , such that the minimal polynomial  of λ has the form  = , for some constants  in . The theorem is named in honor of Charles Joubert, a French mathematician, lycée professor, and Jesuit priest.

In 1867 Joubert published his theorem in his paper Sur l'équation du sixième degré in tome 64 of Comptes rendus hebdomadaires des séances de l'Académie des sciences. He seems to have made the assumption that the fields involved in the theorem are subfields of the complex field.

In 2006  gave a proof of Joubert's theorem "based on an enhanced version of Joubert’s argument".

References

Field (mathematics)
Theorems in abstract algebra